Sir William Geoffrey Ehrman  (born 28 August 1950) is a retired British diplomat and former Chairman of the Joint Intelligence Committee.

Early life
Ehrman was born on 28 August 1950 to the historian John Patrick William Ehrman and Susan Blake. He was educated at Eton College, followed by Trinity College, Cambridge, from which he graduated with a first class degree in Chinese.

Career
Ehrman joined the British Diplomatic Service in 1973 and had postings in Beijing, New York and Hong Kong.  He was Principal Private Secretary to three Foreign Secretaries from 1995 to 1997 and the British Ambassador to Luxembourg from 1998 to 2000.

He was the Foreign and Commonwealth Office's Director General for Defence and Intelligence between 2002 and 2004, before becoming Chairman of the United Kingdom's Joint Intelligence Committee from 2004 to 2005 and British Ambassador to China from 2006 to 2010. Ehrman gave evidence to the Iraq Inquiry in November 2009.

Personal life
Ehrman is married to Penelope Anne Le Patourel (daughter of Brigadier Wallace Le Patourel ), and the couple have three daughters and a son.

References

External links 

Living people
People educated at Eton College
Alumni of Trinity College, Cambridge
Members of HM Diplomatic Service
Ambassadors of the United Kingdom to China
Ambassadors of the United Kingdom to Luxembourg
Chairs of the Joint Intelligence Committee (United Kingdom)
Knights Commander of the Order of St Michael and St George
1950 births
Principal Private Secretaries to the Secretary of State for Foreign and Commonwealth Affairs
20th-century British diplomats